Rembong is a language of central Flores, in East Nusa Tenggara Province, Indonesia.

References

Further reading

 
 

Sumba languages
Languages of Indonesia